16th Joseph Plateau Awards
2003

Best Film: 
 The Son 
The 16th Joseph Plateau Awards, given in 2003, honored the best Belgian filmmaking of 2002.

Jean-Pierre and Luc Dardenne's Le fils (The Son) won three awards: Best Film, Actor (Decleir) and Director.

Winners
Best Actor: 
Olivier Gourmet - Le fils (The Son) and Une part de ciel (A Piece of Sky)
Best Actress (tie): 
Antje de Boeck - Hop
Els Dottermans - Meisje (Girl)
Best Composer (tie): 
Vincent D'Hondt - Hop 
Daan Stuyven - Meisje (Girl)
Best Director: 
Jean-Pierre and Luc Dardenne - Le fils (The Son)
Best Documentary: 
Iran - sous le voile des apparences (Iran: Veiled Appearances)
Best Film: 
Le fils
Best Screenplay: 
No Man's Land - Danis Tanovic
Best Short Film: 
Snapshot
Box office award: 
Alias

2002 film awards